Stephen ("Steve") Kenyon (born 16 September 1951) is a retired male long-distance runner from England, who competed in the late 1970s and early 1980s in the men's marathon and half marathon. He set his personal best of 2:11:40 over the classic distance on 13 June 1982 in Gateshead.
He is a life member of both Bolton United Harriers & Salford Harriers.
He has competed in nine World Cross Country Championships, with his highest finish being 17th at the 1980 race, where he was a member of the winning England team. He won the Great North Run in 1985. He was raised in Bolton, England.

Achievements

1986 3rd Great North Run
1982 AAA Marathon Champion
1979 3rd New York Marathon

Personal Bests:
5,000 m 13:45
10,000 m 28:20
10 mile 46:11
half marathon 61:31
marathon 2:11:40

References

ARRS
gbrathletics

1951 births
Living people
English male long-distance runners
British male marathon runners
Sportspeople from Bolton